Gornja Toponica is a village situated in Niš municipality in Serbia.

References

Populated places in Nišava District